Ceruraphis is a genus of true bugs belonging to the family Aphididae.

The genus was first described by Börner in 1926.

The species of this genus are found in Europe and Northern America.

Species include:
 Ceruraphis eriophori (Walker, 1848)

References

Aphididae